John N. Peterson Farm is a historic home, farm, and national historic district located near Poplar, Mitchell County, North Carolina. The farmhouse was built about 1870, and is a two-story, three bay, single pile I-house with vernacular folk Victorian sawn detailing.  The front facade features a double-tier, semi-engaged, broken-slope, shed-roofed front porch.  Other contributing resources are a barn dated to the second half of the 19th century and the agricultural landscape.

It was added to the National Register of Historic Places in 1990.

References

Farms on the National Register of Historic Places in North Carolina
Historic districts on the National Register of Historic Places in North Carolina
Victorian architecture in North Carolina
Houses completed in 1870
Buildings and structures in Mitchell County, North Carolina
National Register of Historic Places in Mitchell County, North Carolina